The Omaha Rail and Commerce Historic District, roughly bounded by Jackson, 15th, and 8th Streets, as well as the Union Pacific main line, is located in downtown Omaha, Nebraska. Today this historic district includes several buildings listed individually on the National Register of Historic Places, including the Union Pacific Depot and the Burlington Station.

About
The Union Pacific Railroad was of central importance to the growth of Omaha, particularly between 1887 and 1945. Buildings in the Omaha Rail and Commerce Historic District were built to serve business related to the main line of the transcontinental railroad, which runs through the present-day district. Large warehouses, manufacturing warehouses, transfer and storage companies, and service businesses filled the area.

Today, the buildings border the Old Market, and serve as apartments, artist studios and other commercial enterprises.

Notable buildings

Several buildings within the Omaha Rail and Commerce Historic District are listed on the National Register of Historic Places or are significant for their local history.

See also
 Railroads in Omaha
 Jobbers Canyon Historic District
 Old Market Historic District
 Warehouses in Omaha MPS

References

History of Downtown Omaha, Nebraska
National Register of Historic Places in Omaha, Nebraska
Historic districts in Omaha, Nebraska
Historic districts on the National Register of Historic Places in Nebraska